Diamonds & Rust is the sixteenth studio album (and eighteenth overall) by American singer-songwriter Joan Baez, released in 1975. The album covered songs written or played by Bob Dylan, Stevie Wonder, The Allman Brothers, Jackson Browne and John Prine. Diamonds & Rust, however, also contains a number of her own compositions, including the title track, a distinctive song written about Bob Dylan, which has been covered by various other artists.

An alternate recording of "Dida" had appeared on the previous year's Gracias a la Vida.

Track listing
All songs composed by Joan Baez; except where noted.
Side one
"Diamonds & Rust" - 4:47
"Fountain of Sorrow" (Jackson Browne) - 4:30
"Never Dreamed You'd Leave in Summer" (Stevie Wonder, Syreeta Wright) - 2:45
"Children and All That Jazz" - 3:07
"Simple Twist of Fate" (Bob Dylan) - 4:44

Side two
"Blue Sky" (Dickey Betts) - 2:46
"Hello in There" (John Prine) - 3:05
"Jesse" (Janis Ian) - 4:28
"Winds of the Old Days" - 3:55
"Dida" (Joan Baez) – duet with Joni Mitchell - 3:25
Medley: "I Dream of Jeannie" (Stephen Foster; arranged by Joan Baez) / "Danny Boy" (Frederick Weatherly) - 4:13

Personnel 
Joan Baez – vocals, acoustic guitar, Moog and ARP synthesisers, arranger, producer
Larry Carlton – electric guitar, acoustic guitar, arranger, producer
Dean Parks – electric guitar, acoustic guitar
Wilton Felder – bass
Reinie Press – bass
Max Bennett – bass (10)
Jim Gordon – drums
John Guerin – drums (10)
Larry Knechtel – acoustic piano
Joe Sample – electric piano, Hammond organ
Hampton Hawes – acoustic piano (4)
David Paich – acoustic piano, electric harpsichord
Red Rhodes – pedal steel guitar
Malcolm Cecil – Moog and ARP synthesisers, synthesizer programming
Robert Margouleff - synthesizer programming
Tom Scott – flute, saxophone, arranger
Jim Horn – saxophone
Joni Mitchell – vocal improvisation (10)
Rick Lotempio – electric guitar (10)
Ollie Mitchell – trumpet
Buck Monari – trumpet
Jesse Ehrlich - cello
Carl LaMagna, James Getzoff, Ray Kelley, Robert Konrad, Robert Ostrowsky, Ronald Folsom, Sidney Sharp, Tibor Zelig, William Hymanson, William Kurasch - violin
Isabelle Daskoff - viola
Technical
David Kershenbaum – producer
Bernard Gelb - executive producer
Rick Ruggeri – engineer
Henry Lewy – engineer (10)
Ellis Sorkin – assistant engineer
Bob Cato – design
Irene Harris - photography

Charts

Weekly charts

Year-end charts

Certifications

References

1975 albums
Joan Baez albums
A&M Records albums
Albums produced by David Kershenbaum
Albums recorded at Wally Heider Studios
Albums recorded at A&M Studios